Robert "Bob" MacKenzie is a Scottish former professional darts player who competed members in the 1980s.

Career
McKenzie played in three successive World Professional Darts Championships but lost in the first round on all three occasions.  In 1986, McKenzie was beaten 3-1 by John Lowe from England, in 1987, he lost 3–0 in Finland's Tapani Uitos and in 1988 he was defeated 3-2 by England's Dennis Hickling.

Before his World Championship debut, McKenzie reached the second round of the 1984 Winmau World Masters, beating Raymond Rogers in round one before losing to Terry O'Dea.  He was runner-up in the 1986 British Pentathlon behind John Lowe.

World Championship results

BDO
 1986: Last 32: (lost to John Lowe 1–3)
 1987: Last 32: (lost to Tapani Uitos 0–3)
 1988: Last 32: (lost to Dennis Hickling 2–3)

External links
Profile and stats on Darts Database

Living people
Scottish darts players
1962 births
British Darts Organisation players